The Legend of Hanuman is an Indian animated series created by Sharad Devarajan, Jeevan J. Kang and Charuvi Agrawal for Disney+ Hotstar. The series produced by Graphic India premiered on January 29, 2021.

The series was renewed for a second season on July 27, 2021.

Synopsis 
The series follows When God Mahadev incarnates as Hanuman to serve God Rama and his transformation from a mighty warrior to a god and how Hanuman became the beacon of hope amidst the harrowing darkness.

Voice actors 

 Sanket Mhatre as Shree Ram
 Surbhi Pandey as Sita
Damandeep Singh Baggan as Hanuman and Void Demon
 Vikrant Chaturvedi as Sugreev
 Richard Joel as Lakshmana
 Sharad Kelkar as Ravana
 Rohan Jadav as Teenage Ravana
 Shakti Singh as Jambavana
 Sahil Vaid as Vali
 Toshi Sinha as Shurpanakha
 Rajesh Jolly as Sampati
 Aaditya Raj Sharma as Hariya
 Pushkar Vijay as Angada
 Rohan Verma as Nal
 Shailendra Pandey as Pavan Dev
 Surendra Bhatia as Walkilya & Sage Vishrawa Muni
 Vikram Kochhar as Suketu
 Amit Deondi as Neel (Brother of Nal)

Production 
The team used animatics for allowing actors to act instead of just dubbing to the animated work. The character design work was done by the co-creator Charuvi Agrawal.

Episodes

Season 1

Season 2

Release 
The series premiered on Disney+ Hotstar globally on January 29, 2021, in seven Indian  languages with 5.1 audio.

Promotion 
The first trailer for the series was released on January 18, 2021, by Disney+ Hotstar in Hindi, Bengali, Telugu, Marathi, Tamil, Kannada and Malayalam languages.

References

External links 
 

Hindi-language Disney+ Hotstar original programming
2021 Indian television series debuts
Indian drama television series
Indian fantasy television series
Hindi-language television shows
2021 animated television series debuts
Hanuman in popular culture
Television series based on the Ramayana
Television shows based on poems
Indian animated action television series